John Givler Brackenridge (December 24, 1880 – March 20, 1953) was a  Major League Baseball pitcher. Brackenridge played for the Philadelphia Phillies in the  season. In 7 career games, he had a 0-1 record with a  5.56 ERA. He batted and threw right-handed.

Brackenridge was born and died in Harrisburg, Pennsylvania.

External links
Baseball Reference.com page

1880 births
1953 deaths
Philadelphia Phillies players
St. Louis Cardinals scouts
Baseball players from Harrisburg, Pennsylvania
Minor league baseball managers
Newark Sailors players
Lancaster Red Roses players
Akron Champs players
Vernon Tigers players
Nashville Vols players
Shamokin (minor league baseball) players